I Will Stand by You: The Essential Collection is a greatest hits collection by American country music duo The Judds. The album was released on April 5, 2011, via Curb Records, and includes twelve of The Judds' singles and two newly recorded songs. The album's first single, "I Will Stand by You", was released to country radio in late 2010.

Track listing
"Mama He's Crazy" (Kenny O'Dell) - 3:14
"Why Not Me" (Harlan Howard, Sonny Throckmorton, Brent Maher) - 3:31
"Girls' Night Out" (Maher, Jeff H. Bullock) - 2:54
"Love Is Alive" (Kent Robbins) - 4:01
"Have Mercy" (Paul Kennerley) - 3:22
"Grandpa (Tell Me 'Bout the Good Old Days)" (Jamie O'Hara) - 4:15
"Rockin' with the Rhythm of the Rain" (Maher, Don Schlitz) - 2:41
"I Know Where I'm Going" (Don Schlitz, Craig Bickhardt, Maher) - 3:39
"Turn It Loose" (Schlitz, Bickhardt, Maher) - 3:44
"Young Love (Strong Love)" (Kennerley, Robbins) - 4:23
"Love Can Build a Bridge" (Paul Overstreet, Naomi Judd, John Barlow Jarvis) - 5:24
"Flies on the Butter (You Can't Go Home Again)" (Chuck Cannon, Austin Cunningham, Allen Shamblin) – 4:30
"I Will Stand by You" (Steven Lee Olsen, Robert Ellis Orrall) – 3:46
"Back Home" – 3:48 (Darrell Scott, Bruce Robison)
featuring Alison Krauss

Personnel on new tracks

The Judds
 Naomi Judd – vocals
 Wynonna Judd – vocals

Additional musicians
 Tim Akers – keyboards, organ
 Eddie Bayers – drums
 Bob Britt – electric guitar
 Spencer Campbell – bass guitar
 Maurice Carter – background vocals
 Alison Krauss – vocals on "Back Home"
 Gordon Mote – piano, synthesizer
 Don Potter – banjo, acoustic guitar, mandolin
 Jaimee Paul Shires – background vocals
 Nir Z. – drums, percussion

Chart performance

References

2011 greatest hits albums
The Judds compilation albums
Curb Records compilation albums